Oleg Borisovich Kuzhlev (born 12 August 1966) is a Russian professional football coach and a former player.

Club career
He made his professional debut in the Soviet Top League in 1983 for FC Spartak Moscow.

He played 1 game for the main FC Dynamo Moscow squad in the USSR Federation Cup.

Personal life
His son Oleg Olegovich Kuzhlev also played football professionally.

Honours
 Soviet Top League champion: 1987.
 Soviet Top League runner-up: 1983, 1984, 1985.
 Soviet Top League bronze: 1986.
 Soviet Cup winner: 1992.
 Russian Premier League champion: 1992.

European club competitions
With FC Spartak Moscow.

 UEFA Cup 1986–87: 4 games, 1 goal.
 European Cup 1988–89: 2 games.
 European Cup Winners' Cup 1992–93: 1 game.

References

1966 births
Sportspeople from Krasnoyarsk
Living people
Soviet footballers
Russian footballers
Association football midfielders
Soviet Top League players
Russian Premier League players
Soviet expatriate footballers
Russian expatriate footballers
Expatriate footballers in Czechoslovakia
Expatriate footballers in Tunisia
Russian expatriate sportspeople in Tunisia
Expatriate footballers in China
Russian expatriate sportspeople in China
Expatriate footballers in Belarus
Russian expatriate sportspeople in Belarus
FC Spartak Moscow players
FC Dynamo Moscow players
FC Lokomotiv Moscow players
MŠK Žilina players
Étoile Sportive du Sahel players
FC Yugra Nizhnevartovsk players
Pudong Zobon players
FC Dynamo Brest players
Russian football managers